The 1978–79 season was Chelsea Football Club's sixty-fifth competitive season.

Table

References

External links
 1978–79 season at stamford-bridge.com

1978–79
English football clubs 1978–79 season